Fight Club Akhmat (FCA) is a professional sports club from the Chechen Republic and has training bases in the regions of Russia. It was founded in 2014 and named after the first president of the Chechen Republic in Russia — Akhmat Kadyrov.

History 
The Akhmat Sports Club was founded in mid-2014. It was named after the first President of Chechnya, Russia, Akhmat Kadyrov. The sports club belongs to the administration of the Chechen Republic. Ramzan Kadyrov is considered the owner of the club. Initially, the club was created to develop boxing talents. In time, the club gained momentum and began to grow and by the end of 2016 was considered to be one of the main sports clubs in Russia. Towards the end of 2016, the club's management decided to develop mixed martial arts (MMA) along with boxing.

At the end of 2018, the leadership of the Berkut and Akhmat fight clubs from the Chechen Republic announced their merger, in connection with this, it was also decided to merge the league of the Akhmat club with the Absolute Championship Berkut (ACB) league, created on the basis of the Berkut fight club. In December 2018, the leadership of the Akhmat club officially announced the merger of ACB and World Fighting Championship Akhmat into a single league called Absolute Championship Akhmat. Alexey Yatsenko, the former head of the Russian fighting organization Tech-KREP FC, became the president of the united league.

Controversies 
In July 2017, HBO's Real Sports released a documentary that revealed how Kadyrov uses the club to train members of the Kadyrovites although only a handful of them went on to become professional fighters.

In 2021, a Siberian journalist, Andrei Afanasyev was attacked outside his apartment by unknown assailants after investigating the club.

In 2022, the club was mentioned in a Telegram post by Ramzan Kadyrov that was addressed to Elon Musk stating he is offering to train him there to fight Vladimir Putin.

Fighters 
 Alexander Emelianenko
 Diana Avsaragova
 Fabricio Werdum
 Magomed Ankalaev
 Magomed Bibulatov
 Magomedrasul Khasbulaev
 Maxim Grishin
 Ruslan Magomedov
 Said Nurmagomedov
 Vitaly Bigdash

Literature

See also 
 List of Top Professional MMA Training Camps

References

External links 
 

Mixed martial arts training facilities
Martial arts in Russia